The Yangliujing Formation is a Middle Triassic geologic unit found in the Guizhou and Yunnan Provinces of southern China.

Description 
Most of the formation is represented by massive dolomites, indicative of a shallow-water depositional environment. Fossils are generally rare, but conodonts from the Anisian-Ladinian boundary (namely several species of Neogondolella) are known from the lower part of the formation. Some marine reptiles have been found in dolomitic limestone near Dingxiao, an area of Guizhou sometimes considered to preserve the upper part of the Yangliujing Formation. However, under a more restrictive definition of the Yangliujing Formation, the fossils of Dingxiao would instead belong to the overlying Zhuganpo Formation.

Fossil content 
The following fossils have been reported from the formation:
Fish
 Omanoselache contrarius
 ?Parvodus sp.
 ?Semionotiformes indet.
Brachiopods
 Mentzelia sp.
 Nudispiriferina sp.
Bivalves
 Asoella illyrica
 Unionites sp.
Crinoids
 Traumatocrinus hsui
Conodonts
 Ozarkodina kockeli

References

Bibliography 
   
   
 
  

Geologic formations of China
Triassic System of Asia
Triassic China
Anisian Stage
Ladinian Stage
Dolomite formations
Limestone formations
Shallow marine deposits
Paleontology in Guizhou
Paleontology in Yunnan